WBTC is an AM radio station in Uhrichsville, Ohio, United States, broadcasting on 1540 kHz with a classic hits format. It is the sister station of WNPQ (FM). The station was founded in 1963 by James Natoli and is held in the name of his company, Tuscarawas Broadcasting. Natoli died on June 1, 2017.

WBTC features locally oriented hosts on weekday drive-times: Brad Shupe in mornings and Robert Bray in afternoons. Under its previous talk format, the station also carried locally hosted talk shows Dial-and-Deal with J.R. Richards and Dial-and-Speak conducted by Dr. Andrea Fanti - the only call-in radio show in Tuscarawas County - in addition to The Rush Limbaugh Show and The Sean Hannity Show, and had been an affiliate of Fox Sports Radio for evenings and weekends. In October 2017, WBTC shifted to oldies programming on evenings and weekends, and took the format full-time that November.

Unlike most radio stations in the Northeastern United States assigned to the clear-channel frequency of 1540 kHz (all of whom must sign off at sunset to protect KXEL in Waterloo, Iowa and/or ZNS-1 in Nassau, Bahamas) WBTC has 5 watts of night power assigned. Prior to adding an FM translator (W270CI 101.9 FM) in 2016, WBTC voluntarily signed off nightly at 9:00 p.m. (give or take live sports play-by-play events), but has since taken a 24-hour program lineup.

WBTC also offers on-line streaming from its web page.

References

External links
WBTC web page

BTC (AM)
Classic hits radio stations in the United States
Radio stations established in 1963
1963 establishments in Ohio